Giovanni Battista Lomellino (died 1599) was a Roman Catholic prelate who served as Bishop of Isernia (1567–1599)
and Bishop of Guardialfiera (1562–1567).

Biography
On 17 April 1562, Giovanni Battista Lomellino was appointed during the papacy of Pope Pius IV as Bishop of Guardialfiera.
On 17 March 1567, he was appointed during the papacy of Pope Pius V as Bishop of Isernia.)
He served as Bishop of Isernia until his death on 22 November 1599.

References

External links and additional sources
 (for Chronology of Bishops) 
 (for Chronology of Bishops) 
 (for Chronology of Bishops) 
 (for Chronology of Bishops)  

16th-century Italian Roman Catholic bishops
Bishops appointed by Pope Pius IV
Bishops appointed by Pope Pius V
1599 deaths